The Patient Access Network Foundation (PAN Foundation) is a US-based non-profit 501(c)(3) organization that works to help Americans pay for medical procedures. The organization was ranked #34 in Forbes' 2019 list of "top 100 US Charities", with private donations in 2019 totaling $434 million. PAN Foundation reports it has given over $4 billion to almost one million people since its inception in 2004.

Programs 
The PAN Foundation has contributed to the establishment of a fund for research on Parkinson's disease. PANF also has partnerships with the Heart Failure Society of America and Allscripts Health Solutions.  The Foundation also names advocacy as one of its program focuses, including encouraging patients to contact their elected representatives and support programs for greater medical coverage. It is a member of the Medicare Access for Patients Rx, a collection of organizations advocating for patients with chronic disease and disability who are on Medicare.

In 2020 PANF launched a new program to support those diagnosed with or quarantining because of COVID-19.

Leadership 
In 2021 the Foundation appointed a new president and CEO, Kevin Hagan.

Controversy 
In 2019 PANF agreed to pay $4 million to settle a allegations with the US Attourney's Office that they violated the False Claims Act by "enabling pharmaceutical companies to pay kickbacks to Medicare patients taking the companies’ drugs."

References

Health charities in the United States
Organizations established in 2004